The 2021 Pennsylvania elections were held on November 2, 2021, to fill judicial positions on the Supreme Court, Superior Court, Commonwealth Court, allow judicial retention votes, and fill numerous county, local and municipal offices. The necessary primary elections were held on May 18. In addition, special elections for legislative vacancies were held at various times in 2021.

Special elections

Pennsylvania State Senate

22nd senatorial district 
On February 14, Democratic State Senator John Blake announced he would be resigning from the Senate to take a position with Congressman Matt Cartwright. A special election was announced by Lt. Governor (and Senate President) John Fetterman for May 18, in conjunction with the 2021 primary election.

Democrats held a special convention where State Representative Marty Flynn won the party's nomination. Republicans nominated Lackawanna County Commissioner Chris Chermak. The Libertarian Party nominated Nathan Covington, and the Green Party nominated Marlene Sebastianelli. Flynn defeated the field the special election.

48th senatorial district 

A special election was announced by Lt. Governor (and Senate President) John Fetterman to coincide with the 2021 primaries on May 18 following the death of State Senator Dave Arnold.

The Libertarian Party nominated York County business owner and farmer Timothy McMaster. Former state representative Edward H. Krebs announced he would launch an independent bid for this seat. Democrats nominated Dr. Calvin Clements, a retired veterinarian. Republicans nominated Lebanon County businessman Christopher Gebhard.

Pennsylvania House of Representatives

59th legislative district 
House Speaker Bryan Cutler announced a special election for the 59th legislative district will take place on May 18 (in conjunction with the 2021 primary) after the death of Republican State Representative Mike Reese.

Democrats nominated Ligonier Borough Councilwoman Mariah Fisher. Republicans held a special convention and nominated Leslie Rossi, a Latrobe native and creator of the "Trump House". The Libertarian Party nominated Robb Luther.

Rossi defeated Fisher and Luther in the special election, and will become the district's first female representative.

60th legislative district 
On March 16, State Representative Jeff Pyle announced his retirement due to health issues. House Speaker Bryan Cutler called for a special election for the 60th legislative district on May 18, in conjunction with the 2021 primary.

Republicans nominated Pyle's chief of staff Abby Major. Libertarians nominated Waynesburg University senior Drew Hreha. Democrats nominated Dr. Frank Prazenica Jr., a retired colonel in the United States Army Reserve.

113th legislative district 
As a result of his State Senate special election victory, Marty Flynn resigned from his State House seat on June 9. House Speaker Bryan Cutler called for a special election for the 113th legislative district on November 2, in conjunction with the 2021 general election.

Democrats nominated Flynn's chief of staff Thom Welby. Republicans nominated Dominick Manetti, a former deputy sheriff of Lackawanna County.

164th legislative district 
On July 22, State Representative Margo L. Davidson resigned her seat after being charged with stealing from the Commonwealth by filing fraudulent overnight per diem requests and various other expenses through the State House Comptroller's Office as well as hindering a state prosecution. House Speaker Bryan Cutler called for a special election for the 164th legislative district on November 2, in conjunction with the 2021 general election.

Democrats nominated Upper Darby School District board member Gina Curry. Republicans nominated Brian Sharif Taylor, a United States Army veteran. Libertarians nominated community activist Aniket Josan.

Justice of the Supreme Court 
One vacancy will occur after Chief Justice Thomas G. Saylor reaches the mandatory retirement age of 75 on December 14, 2021.

Democratic primary 
Maria McLaughlin, a judge on the Superior Court of Pennsylvania, ran unopposed in the Democratic primary.

Results

Republican primary

Candidates 
 P. Kevin Brobson, President Judge, Commonwealth Court of Pennsylvania
 Patricia McCullough, Judge, Commonwealth Court of Pennsylvania
 Paula A. Patrick, Judge Philadelphia County Court of Common Pleas

Results

General election

Results 

  
  
  
  

Republican Kevin Brobson was elected.

Judge of the Superior Court 
One vacancy was created when President Judge Emeritus Susan P. Gantman took senior status in 2020.

Democratic primary

Candidates 
 Timika Lane, Judge, Philadelphia County Court of Common Pleas
Jill Beck, Allegheny County attorney
Bryan Neft, Allegheny County attorney

Results

Republican primary 
Megan Sullivan, a Chester County attorney and ex-wife of former state Representative Warren Kampf, ran unopposed in the Republican primary.

Results

General election

Results 

  
  
  
  

Republican Megan Sullivan was elected.

Judge of the Commonwealth Court 
Two vacancies were created after Judge Mary Hannah Leavitt declined to run for retention and Judge Bonnie Brigance Leadbetter took senior status.

Democratic primary

Candidates 
 Lori Dumas, Judge, Philadelphia County Court of Common Pleas
Amanda Green-Hawkins, attorney and former Allegheny County Council member, nominee for Superior Court of Pennsylvania in 2019
David Spurgeon, Judge, Allegheny County Court of Common Pleas
Sierra Street, Judge, Philadelphia County Court of Common Pleas

Results

Republican primary 
Stacy Marie Wallace and Drew Crompton ran unopposed in the Republican primary.

Results

General election

Results 

  
  
  
  
  
  
  

Republican Stacy Marie Wallace was elected. A recount was triggered because Dumas and Crompton finished within half a percentage point of each other in the initial tally. On November 23, counties completed the recount, and Crompton conceded to Dumas. The following day, statewide recount results were published, which affirmed Dumas's lead.

Judicial Retention

Superior Court 
Judges John T. Bender and Mary Jane Bowes were up for retention in 2021.

Commonwealth Court 
Judges Anne Covey and Renee Cohn Jubelirer were up for retention in 2021.

Mayoral Elections

Pittsburgh

Lancaster

Allentown

Harrisburg

Ballot Questions 
Pennsylvania voters considered three constitutional amendments and one statewide referendum in the May 18 primary.

Constitutional Amendments

Restricting emergency disaster declarations and powers 

In 2020, Governor Tom Wolf declared a disaster emergency for the state of Pennsylvania due to the COVID-19 pandemic. Several Republicans, led by state representative Russ Diamond, opposed these public-health measures and introduced two amendments (2021-01 and 2021–02) to the Pennsylvania Constitution to restrict the emergency powers of the governor. Resolutions 2021-01 and 2021-02 were on the May primary ballot.

Racial equality 
A third constitutional amendment (2021-03) would create a prohibition against denying an individual's rights because of race or ethnicity. Resolution 2021-03 was on the May primary ballot.

Statewide Referendum 
Act 91 of 2020 placed before the electorate a question about allowing municipal fire companies, ambulance services, and rescue squads to use loans which are usually only allowed for volunteer companies. The Act 91 referendum was placed on the May primary ballot.

References 

Pennsylvania elections
 
Pennsylvania
Pennsylvania elections by year
Pennsylvania special elections
Pennsylvania
Pennsylvania
Pennsylvania judicial elections
Constitutional amendments